The Barbara Fritchie Stakes is an American race for Thoroughbred horses run at Laurel Park Racecourse in February. A Grade III event, this race is open to fillies and mares age four and up. It is run at seven furlongs on the dirt and offers a purse of $250,000. Originally a handicap, the race is currently run under allowance weight conditions.

The race is run in honor of Barbara Fritchie, who was an American patriot during the American Civil War. According to legend, Fritchie, a 95-year-old woman at the time, stood in the street and attempted to block or at least antagonize Confederate General Thomas "Stonewall" Jackson and his troops by waving the Union flag as they marched through Frederick, Maryland, on their campaign to the Battle of Gettysburg.

The Barbara Fritchie Handicap was run at Bowie Race Course in Bowie, Maryland, from 1952-1984 before being moved to its present location at Laurel Park. The race was a grade 3 race from 1973-1991 before being upgraded to grade 2 status for the 1992 running. The race was not held in 1960, 1972 and 2006. Its distance was six furlongs from 1957 to 1959 and 1963, and it was run at one mile in 1961. Tosmah won this race in 1966. The race was downgraded to Grade III status in 2019.

The race was run in two divisions in 1982, 1984 and 1985.

Records 

Speed record: 
 7 furlongs - 1:21.40 - Tappiano  (1989)
 6 furlongs - 1:10.80 - All Brandy (1963)  and  Tinkalero  (1958)
  miles - 1:44.80 - Sotto Voce  (1954)

Most wins by an horse:
 2 - Xtra Heat (2002 & 2003); 
 2 - Twixt  (1974 & 1975); 
 2 - Skipat  (1979 & 1981)

Most wins by a jockey:
 4 - Donnie Miller Jr.    (1982, 1984, 1984, 1985)

Most wins by a trainer:
 3 - 	J. Bowes Bond  (1952, 1958, 1970)
 3 - Katharine Voss    (1974, 1975, 1992)

Most wins by an owner:
 2 - nine different owners are tied with two wins each

Winners

See also 
 Barbara Fritchie Handicap "top three finishers" and starters

References

External links
Laurel Park racetrack

Graded stakes races in the United States
Sprint category horse races for fillies and mares
Horse races in Maryland
Laurel Park Racecourse
Bowie Race Track
1952 establishments in Maryland
Horse races established in 1952